Celorico da Beira is a municipality in Guarda District in Portugal. The municipality population in 2011 was 7,693, in an area of 247.22 km2.

Main town: Celorico da Beira, near the Mondego River.

Principal monument: Celorico da Beira Castle. Train station: Celorico da Beira, linha da Beira Alta.
The present Mayor is José Francisco Gomes Monteiro, elected by the Socialist Party. The municipal holiday is May 23.

Parishes
Administratively, the municipality is divided into 16 civil parishes (freguesias):

 Açores e Velosa
 Baraçal
 Carrapichana
 Casas do Soeiro
 Celorico (São Pedro e Santa Maria) e Vila Boa do Mondego
 Cortiçô da Serra, Vide Entre Vinhas e Salgueirais
 Forno Telheiro
 Lajeosa do Mondego
 Linhares
 Maçal do Chão
 Mesquitela
 Minhocal
 Prados
 Rapa e Cadafaz
 Ratoeira
 Vale de Azares

Notable people 
 João Cabral (1599-??) a Jesuit missionary to Bhutan.
 José César Ferreira Gil (1858-1922) an Army general and a military historian.
 Artur de Sacadura Freire Cabral (1881–1924) a Portuguese aviation pioneer.
 Alfredo Cunha (born 1953) a Portuguese photographer and photojournalist
 Paulo Gomes (born 1973) a Portuguese marathon runner.

References

External links
Municipality official website

Towns in Portugal
Municipalities of Guarda District
People from Celorico da Beira